A Bit of What You Fancy is the debut studio album by the English rock band the Quireboys. It was released by EMI on 29 January 1990, and produced by George Tutko and Jim Cregan.

A Bit of What You Fancy remains the Quireboys' most commercially successful album. It peaked at no. 2 on the UK Albums Chart and was certified Gold for sales of over 100,000 units. The album was preceded by four charting singles, with "Hey You" becoming the most successful. The album features contributions from drummer Ian Wallace.

In 2021, the band released a rerecorded version of the album to mark its 30th anniversary.

Track listing
All songs written by Spike and Guy Bailey, except where noted otherwise.

The Japanese release of A Bit of What You Fancy included 2 bonus tracks "Pretty Girls" and "How Do You Feel".

Charts

Certifications and sales

Personnel
Credits adapted from the liner notes of A Bit of What You Fancy.

The Quireboys
Spike – vocals
Guy Bailey – guitar
Guy Griffin – guitar
Nigel Mogg – bass
Ian Wallace – drums
Chris Johnstone – keyboards

Additional musicians
Myrna Mathews – background vocals
Clydene Jackson – background vocals
Julia Walters – background vocals
Kevin Savigan – string arrangement
Lee Thornberg – brass

Singles
 7 O'Clock (1989) UK #36
 Hey You (1989) UK #14
 I Don't Love You Anymore (1990) UK #24
 There She Goes Again (1990) UK #37

References 

1990 debut albums
The Quireboys albums
EMI Records albums